Jean-Guy Hudon (born 24 April 1941) was a Progressive Conservative member of the House of Commons of Canada from 1984 to 1993. He was an administrator by career.

Born in La Pocatière, Quebec, Hudon represented the Quebec riding of Beauharnois—Salaberry, where he was first elected in the 1984 federal election and re-elected in 1988, therefore becoming a member in the 33rd and 34th Canadian Parliaments.

Jean-Guy Hudon is the father of Isabelle Hudon, Canadian Ambassador to France and Monaco from 2017 to 2021, and President and CEO of the Business Development Bank of Canada since 2021.

References

External links
 

1941 births
Living people
Members of the House of Commons of Canada from Quebec
Progressive Conservative Party of Canada MPs
People from Bas-Saint-Laurent